Rhigognostis kovacsi is a species of moth belonging to the family Plutellidae.

It is native to Scandinavia.

References

Plutellidae
Moths described in 1952